Paguyaman River is a river in Gorontalo (province), Sulawesi island, Indonesia, about 1900 km northeast of capital Jakarta.

Hydrology 
Paguyaman River is the largest river in the province of Gorontalo, flowing from west to east, then turning to south, discharging into Gulf of Tomini. The upstream is located in Mount Dapi (1,660 m) or Dapi Mountains at the border between the village Karya Baru, district of Dengilo, and village Hulawa, district of Buntulia in Pohuwato Regency. The river mouth at Gulf of Tomini is located at the border between village Girisa, district of Paguyaman, Boalemo Regency and village Bilato, district Boliyohuto, Gorontalo Regency.

From upstream to the middle Paguyaman river passes through district of Dengilo, Pohuwato Regency, districts of Mananggu, Botumoito, Dulupi, Wonosari, and Paguyaman in Boalemo Regency. From the middle to the downstream it flows through districts of Asparaga, and Boliyohuto in Gorontalo Regency. The upstream area of Paguyaman River is on the high plain of mountains with a deep contour, whereas the middle part is a low plain/alluvial. Near the downstream, Paguyaman cuts through the low mountains of Batulayar until discharging in the coastal zone with an elevation less than 1.0 m above the sea level. The length of the river is about 136.25 km with the average slope of riverbed at 0.0018.

Tributaries 
Paguyaman River has about 146 tributaries, the bigger ones, among others:
 Hulawalu River
 Diloniyohu River
 Bango River
 Odimita River
 Bululi River
 Nantu Diyanga River
 Mohiyolo River
 Daenaa River
 Olimbikau River
 Moliliulo River
 Tilembede River

Geography 

The river flows in the northern area of Sulawesi island with predominantly tropical rainforest climate (designated as Af in the Köppen-Geiger climate classification). The annual average temperature in the area is 23 °C. The warmest month is October, when the average temperature is around 26 °C, and the coldest is February, at 21 °C. The average annual rainfall is 2133 mm. The wettest month is July, with an average of 270 mm rainfall, and the driest is September, with 53 mm rainfall.

See also
List of rivers of Indonesia
List of rivers of Sulawesi

References

External links 
  Daerah Aliran Sungai di Provinsi Gorontalo. Unit Sistem Informasi Sumber Daya Air (SISDA) Balai Wilayah Sungai Sulawesi II. Gorontalo

Rivers of Gorontalo (province)
Rivers of Indonesia